Brian Randolph  Greene (born February 9, 1963) is an  American theoretical physicist, mathematician, and string theorist. Greene was a physics professor at Cornell University from 19901995, and has been a professor at Columbia University since 1996 and chairman of the World Science Festival since co-founding it in 2008.  Greene has worked on mirror symmetry, relating two different Calabi–Yau manifolds (concretely relating the conifold to one of its orbifolds).  He also described the flop transition, a mild form of topology change, showing that topology in string theory can change at the conifold point.

Greene has become known to a wider audience through his books for the general public, The Elegant Universe, Icarus at the Edge of Time, The Fabric of the Cosmos, The Hidden Reality, and related PBS television specials. He also appeared on The Big Bang Theory episode "The Herb Garden Germination", as well as the films Frequency and The Last Mimzy. He is currently a member of the Board of Sponsors of the Bulletin of the Atomic Scientists.

Early life
Greene was born in New York City of Jewish background. His father, Alan Greene, was a one-time vaudeville performer and high school dropout who later worked as a voice coach and composer. After attending Stuyvesant High School, Greene entered Harvard University in 1980 to concentrate in physics. After completing his BA degree with summa cum laude honors in 1984, Greene earned his DPhil degree in theoretical physics at Magdalen College, Oxford, graduating in 1987. While at Oxford, Greene also studied piano with the concert pianist Jack Gibbons.

Career
Greene joined the physics faculty of Cornell University in 1990 and was appointed to a full professorship in 1995. The following year, he joined the faculty of Columbia University as a full professor. At Columbia, Greene is co-director of the university's Institute for Strings, Cosmology, and Astroparticle Physics (ISCAP) and is leading a research program applying superstring theory to cosmological questions. With co-investigators David Albert and Maulik Parikh he is a FQXi large-grant awardee for his project entitled "Arrow of Time in the Quantum Universe".

Research
Greene's area of research is string theory, a candidate for a theory of quantum gravity.  He is known for his contribution to the understanding of the different shapes the curled-up dimensions of string theory can take. The most important of these shapes are so-called Calabi–Yau manifolds; when the extra dimensions take on those particular forms, physics in three dimensions exhibits an abstract symmetry known as supersymmetry.

Greene has worked on a particular class of symmetry relating two different Calabi–Yau manifolds, known as  mirror symmetry and is known for his research on the flop transition, a mild form of topology change, showing that topology in string theory can change at the conifold point.

Currently, Greene studies string cosmology, especially the imprints of trans-Planckian physics on the cosmic microwave background, and brane-gas cosmologies that could explain why the space around us has three large dimensions, expanding on the suggestion of a black hole electron, namely that the electron may be a black hole.

World Science Festival
In 2008, together with Tracy Day (former ABC News producer), Greene co-founded the World Science Festival, whose mission is to cultivate a general public informed by science, inspired by wonder, convinced of its value, and prepared to engage with its implications for the future.

The World Science Festival's signature event is a five-day festival in New York City, typically falling in May. Held at a variety of museums, galleries, and outdoor venues, the festival has surpassed 2 million attendees. Hailed as a "new cultural institution", by The New York Times, the festival has featured Stephen Hawking, Edward O. Wilson, Sir Paul Nurse, James Watson, Anna Deavere Smith, Francis Collins, Philip Glass, Yo-Yo Ma, Oliver Sacks, Mary-Claire King, William Phillips, Paul Davies, Elizabeth Vargas, Steven Weinberg, Sir Roger Penrose, Charlie Rose, Lisa P. Jackson, John Lithgow, Vinton Cerf, Glenn Close, Jeffrey Eugenides, Bill T. Jones, Joyce Carol Oates and Elaine Fuchs.

Communicating science

Greene is well known to a wider audience for his work on popularizing theoretical physics, in particular string theory and the search for a unified theory of physics. His first book, The Elegant Universe: Superstrings, Hidden Dimensions, and the Quest for the Ultimate Theory, published in 1999, is a popularization of superstring theory and M-theory. It was a finalist for the Pulitzer Prize in nonfiction, and winner of The Aventis Prizes for Science Books in 2000. The Elegant Universe was later made into a PBS television special of the same name, hosted and narrated by Greene, which won a 2003 Peabody Award.

Greene's second book, The Fabric of the Cosmos: Space, Time, and the Texture of Reality (2004), is about space, time, and the nature of the universe. Aspects covered in this book include non-local particle entanglement as it relates to special relativity and basic explanations of string theory. It is an examination of the very nature of matter and reality, covering such topics as spacetime and cosmology, origins and unification, and including an exploration into reality and the imagination.  The Fabric of the Cosmos was later made into a PBS television special of the same name, hosted and narrated by Greene.

Greene's third book, The Hidden Reality: Parallel Universes and the Deep Laws of the Cosmos, published in January 2011, deals in greater depth with multiple universes, or, as they are sometimes referred to collectively, the multiverse.

A book for a younger audience, Icarus at the Edge of Time, which is a futuristic re-telling of the Icarus myth, was published September 2, 2008. In addition to authoring popular-science books, Greene is an occasional op-ed contributor for The New York Times, writing on his work and other scientific topics.

Greene's newest book is Until the End of Time. (Knopf)

The popularity of his books and his natural on-camera demeanor have resulted in many media appearances, including Charlie Rose, The Colbert Report, The NewsHour with Jim Lehrer, The Century with Peter Jennings, CNN, Time, Nightline in Primetime, Late Night with Conan O'Brien, and the Late Show with David Letterman. It has also led to Greene helping John Lithgow with scientific dialogue for the television series 3rd Rock from the Sun, and becoming a technical consultant for the film Frequency, in which he also had a cameo role. He was a consultant on the 2006 time-travel movie Déjà Vu.  He also had a cameo appearance as an Intel scientist in 2007's The Last Mimzy.  Greene was also mentioned in the 2002 Angel episode "Supersymmetry" and in the 2008 Stargate Atlantis episode "Trio". In April 2011 he appeared on The Big Bang Theory in the episode "The Herb Garden Germination" as himself, speaking to a small crowd about the contents of his most recent book.

Greene has lectured outside of the collegiate setting, at both a general and a technical level, in more than twenty-five countries. In 2012 his teaching prowess was recognized when he received the Richtmyer Memorial Award, which is given annually by the American Association of Physics Teachers.

In May 2013, the Science Laureates of the United States Act of 2013 (H.R. 1891; 113th Congress) was introduced into Congress.  Brian Greene was listed by one commentator as a possible nominee for the position of Science Laureate, if the act were to pass.

In March 2015, an Australian spider that uses waves to hunt prey, Dolomedes briangreenei, was to be named in honor of Brian Greene.

He was interviewed at length by Jim Al-Khalili on the BBC radio program The Life Scientific on 28 April 2020.

Personal life
Greene is married to former ABC producer Tracy Day. They have one son, Alec,  and one daughter, Sophia. 
Greene has been vegetarian since he was nine years old and a vegan since 1997.

Greene has stated that he regards science as being incompatible with literalist interpretations of religion and that there is much in the New Atheism movement which resonates with him because he personally does not feel the need for religious explanation. However, he is uncertain of its efficacy as a strategy for spreading a scientific worldview. In an interview with The Guardian he says  "When I'm looking to understand myself as a human, and how I fit in to the long chain of human culture that reaches back thousands of years, religion is a deeply valuable part of that story."

Bibliography

Popular science
 Until the End of Time: Mind, Matter, and Our Search for Meaning in an Evolving Universe (2020)
 Light Falls: Space, Time, and an Obsession of Einstein (2016)
 The Hidden Reality: Parallel Universes and the Deep Laws of the Cosmos (2011)
 Icarus at the Edge of Time (2008)
 The Fabric of the Cosmos: Space, Time, and the Texture of Reality (2004)
 The Elegant Universe: Superstrings, Hidden Dimensions, and the Quest for the Ultimate Theory (1999)

Technical articles
For a full list of technical articles, consult the publication list in the INSPIRE-HEP database.

 
 
 R. Easther, B. Greene, W. Kinney, G. Shiu, "Inflation as a Probe of Short Distance Physics". Physical Review. D64 (2001) 103502.
 Brian R. Greene, "D-Brane Topology Changing Transitions". Nuclear Physics. B525 (1998) 284-296.
 Michael R. Douglas, Brian R. Greene, David R. Morrison, "Orbifold Resolution by D-Branes". Nuclear Physics. B506 (1997) 84-106.
 Brian R. Greene, David R. Morrison, Andrew Strominger, "Black Hole Condensation and the Unification of String Vacua". Nuclear Physics. B451 (1995) 109-120.
 P.S. Aspinwall, B.R. Greene, D.R. Morrison, "Calabi–Yau Moduli Space, Mirror Manifolds and Spacetime Topology Change in String Theory". Nuclear Physics. B416 (1994) 414-480.
 B.R.Greene and M.R.Plesser, "Duality in Calabi-Yau Moduli Space". Nuclear Physics. B338 (1990) 15.

References

Further reading

External links

 Brian Greene faculty homepage
 
 
 
 

1963 births
Living people
Alumni of Magdalen College, Oxford
American agnostics
21st-century American physicists
American Rhodes Scholars
American science writers
Columbia University faculty
Cornell University faculty
Harvard College alumni
Science communicators
American string theorists
Stuyvesant High School alumni
People associated with the American Museum of Natural History
Jewish American scientists
Jewish agnostics
Scientists from New York (state)